Blue moon is an ice cream flavor with bright blue coloring, available in the Upper Midwest of the United States. Multiple cities in the region claim to be the originator, with the popular theories including Milwaukee, Wisconsin and Ludington, Michigan. The Chicago Tribune has described the ice cream as "Smurf-blue, marshmallow-sweet".  Blue moon ice cream is one of the flavors that make up Superman ice cream in certain states.

Blue moon is found mainly in the Midwest—Wisconsin and Michigan in particular. It is found less frequently in other U.S. states. Kilwins also provides this flavor in various states.


Characteristics
The varieties of blue moon vary in both color and flavor. Many aficionados of each variety of blue moon claim that their variety is the "real one", the "original", etc.

Some dairies that make Blue Moon keep their ingredients a secret, adding to the mystique. Varieties that have distinct berry or vanilla flavor notes are sometimes theorized to have been originally flavored with castoreum.

Similar international flavors

In Poland, this variety of ice cream is called  ('Smurf-like') and is usually bubble-gum flavored.

References

Flavors of ice cream
Food and drink in Michigan
Cuisine of Minnesota
Wisconsin culture
Cuisine of the Midwestern United States